Stiliani "Stella" Pilatou (born 28 March 1980 in Heraklion) is a Greek long jumper.

Her personal best jump is 6.75 metres, achieved in July 2002 in Volos. This places her fourth in the all-time Greek performers list, behind Niki Xanthou, Paraskevi Tsiamita and Hrysopiyi Devetzi. Pilatou has a better indoor personal best with 6.80 metres.

Competition record

References

External links
 Official website
 HellenicAthletes.com: Stella Pilatou

1980 births
Living people
Greek female long jumpers
Athletes (track and field) at the 2004 Summer Olympics
Olympic athletes of Greece
Universiade medalists in athletics (track and field)
Athletes from Heraklion
Mediterranean Games silver medalists for Greece
Mediterranean Games medalists in athletics
Athletes (track and field) at the 2001 Mediterranean Games
Universiade bronze medalists for Greece
Competitors at the 2001 Summer Universiade
Medalists at the 2007 Summer Universiade